This is a list of winners and nominees of the Primetime Emmy Award for Outstanding Supporting Actress in a Drama Series. In early Primetime Emmy Award ceremonies, the supporting categories were not always genre-, or even gender-, specific. Beginning with the 22nd Primetime Emmy Awards, supporting actresses in drama have competed alone. However, these dramatic performances often included actresses from miniseries, telefilms, and guest performers competing against main cast competitors. Such instances are marked below:

 # – Indicates a performance in a Miniseries or Television film, prior to the category's creation
 § – Indicates a performance as a guest performer, prior to the category's creation

Winners and nominations

1950s

1960s

1970s

1980s

1990s

2000s

2010s

2020s

Programs with multiple wins

4 wins
 Lou Grant (3 consecutive)

3 wins
 Ozark (2 consecutive)
 St. Elsewhere (2 consecutive)
 The Waltons (2 consecutive)
 The West Wing (consecutive)

2 wins
 Breaking Bad (consecutive)
 Caesar's Hour
 Downton Abbey
 Family
 Hill Street Blues (consecutive)
 Huff (consecutive)
 The Practice (consecutive)
 thirtysomething (consecutive)

Programs with multiple nominations

13 nominations
 Hill Street Blues

12 nominations
 Game of Thrones

11 nominations
 Lou Grant
 The West Wing

10 nominations
 Grey's Anatomy
 The Handmaid's Tale
 L.A. Law
 NYPD Blue
 St. Elsewhere

9 nominations
 The Good Wife

8 nominations
 ER

7 nominations
 Downton Abbey
 Mad Men

6 nominations
 Judging Amy
 The Sopranos

5 nominations
 The Crown
 Family
 The Practice
 thirtysomething
 The Waltons

4 nominations
 I Love Lucy
 Mannix
 Northern Exposure
 Trapper John, M.D.

3 nominations
 Ben Casey
 The Bob Cummings Show
 Breaking Bad
 Caesar's Hour
 China Beach
 In Treatment
 Ironside
 The Jackie Gleason Show
 McMillan & Wife
 The Name of the Game
 Ozark
 Six Feet Under
 Succession
 Upstairs, Downstairs
 Westworld

2 nominations
 24
 Arrest and Trial
 Big Little Lies
 Boston Legal
 Brothers & Sisters
 Christy
 Damages
 The Dick Van Dyke Show
 The George Burns and Gracie Allen Show
 Huff
 I'll Fly Away
 Killing Eve
 Make Room for Daddy
 Marcus Welby, M.D.
 Mister Peepers
 Moonlighting
 Orange Is the New Black
 Perry Mason
 Peter Gunn
 Peyton Place
 Stranger Things
 Reasonable Doubts
 Touched by an Angel
 Twin Peaks

Performers with multiple wins

4 wins
 Nancy Marchand (3 consecutive)

3 wins
 Ellen Corby (2 consecutive)
 Julia Garner (2 consecutive)

2 wins
 Bonnie Bartlett (consecutive)
 Tyne Daly 
 Blythe Danner (consecutive)
 Anna Gunn (consecutive)
 Allison Janney (consecutive)
 Kristy McNichol
 Maggie Smith

Performers with multiple nominations

8 nominations
 Tyne Daly

7 nominations
 Nancy Marchand
 Betty Thomas

6 nominations
 Christine Baranski
 Barbara Bosson
 Stockard Channing
 Christina Hendricks

5 nominations
 Ellen Corby
 Lena Headey
 Linda Kelsey
 Sandra Oh
 Christina Pickles

4 nominations
 Gail Fisher
 Susan Ruttan
 Madge Sinclair
 Maggie Smith
 Chandra Wilson

3 nominations
 Barbara Anderson
 Bonnie Bartlett
 Emilia Clarke
 Kim Delaney
 Ann Dowd
 Joanne Froggatt
 Julia Garner
 Rachel Griffiths
 Anna Gunn
 Marg Helgenberger
 Sharon Lawrence
 Melanie Mayron
 Kristy McNichol
 Thandiwe Newton
 Gail O'Grady
 Archie Panjabi
 Susan Saint James
 Nancy Walker
 Samira Wiley

2 nominations
 Uzo Aduba
 Mary Alice
 Lauren Ambrose
 Angela Baddeley
 Barbara Barrie
 Meredith Baxter
 Allyce Beasley
 Candice Bergen
 Helena Bonham Carter
 Millie Bobby Brown
 Rose Byrne
 Blythe Danner
 Cynthia Geary
 Barbara Hale
 Laura Innes
 Allison Janney
 Piper Laurie
 Kay Lenz
 Camryn Manheim
 Julianna Margulies
 Janel Moloney
 Diana Muldaur
 CCH Pounder
 Della Reese
 Gloria Reuben
 Doris Roberts
 Fiona Shaw
 Sarah Snook
 Yvonne Strahovski
 Holland Taylor
 Maura Tierney
 Aida Turturro
 Elena Verdugo
 Dianne Wiest
 Maisie Williams

Notes

See also
 Golden Globe Award for Best Supporting Actress – Series, Miniseries, or Television Film

References

Supporting Actress - Drama Series
 
Emmy Award